16th Avenue Records was an independent record label specializing in country music. The first 16th Avenue label was founded in Toronto in May 1981 by Apple Productions Corporation principals Stan Campbell and Veronica Mataseje. In May 1984, 16th Avenue Records moved to Nashville, Tennessee. In 1987 the Opryland Music Group assumed the 16th Avenue Records name with Jerry Bradley as President. The label's first signee was Charley Pride, whose 1987 single "Have I Got Some Blues for You" was the label's first release.

Other artists who recorded for 16th Avenue included Vicki Bird, Canyon, Lane Caudell, John Conlee, Neal McCoy,  Robin & Cruiser, John Wesley Ryles, and Randy VanWarmer. The label closed in November 1990.

References

American country music record labels
American independent record labels
Record labels established in 1986
Record labels disestablished in 1990
Defunct record labels of the United States
Record labels based in Nashville, Tennessee
1986 establishments in Tennessee